Endresen is a surname. Notable people with the surname include:

Egil Endresen (1920–1992), Norwegian judge and politician 
Gabriel Endresen Moseid (1882–1961), Norwegian politician
Sidsel Endresen (born 1952), Norwegian singer, composer, and actress
Tor Endresen (born 1959), Norwegian singer and composer

See also
Endreson